Fossombroniales is an order of liverworts.

Taxonomy
 Allisoniaceae Schljakov
 Allisonia
 Fossombroniaceae Hazsl., nom. cons.
 Fossombronia
 Calyculariaceae He-Nygrén et al.
 Calycularia
 Makinoaceae Nakai
 Makinoa
 Petalophyllaceae Stotler & Crandall-Stotler
 Petalophyllum
 Sewardiella

References

 
Liverwort orders